Dar Yaghmouracene is a town and commune in Tlemcen Province in northwestern Algeria.

See also

Yaghmurasan Ibn Zyan

References

Communes of Tlemcen Province
Tlemcen Province